KFTN-LP (92.7 FM) is a radio station licensed to serve the community of Fenton, Missouri. The station is owned by the Rockwood School District. It airs a classic rock format.

The station was assigned the KFTN-LP call letters by the Federal Communications Commission on March 14, 2014. It was only the second high school radio station in Missouri to receive an FCC license.

References

External links
Official Website

FTN-LP
FTN-LP
High school radio stations in the United States
Radio stations established in 2015
2015 establishments in Missouri
Classic rock radio stations in the United States
St. Louis County, Missouri